Rhodamnia is a group of rainforest trees and shrubs in the myrtle family described as a genus in 1822. They are native to southern China, Southeast Asia, Papuasia, Australia, and New Caledonia.

The name is derived from the Greek rhodon which means "rose". And amnion, "bowl" where the blood of lambs was poured after sacrifice. It refers to the bowl shaped calyx tubes. Leaves are opposite and mostly three veined in appearance. The fruit is a small berry with a few seeds.

Species

References

 
Myrtaceae genera